Mysore city in Karnataka, India has become an educational hub because of good weather and a cheaper cost of living.  A large number of students from different parts of India and a few hundreds of students from foreign countries live and study here. Mysore ranks 5th among Indian cities that attracts foreign students.  Students from 52 countries study here for undergraduate and post-graduate courses.  Around 1,000 students arrive in Mysore every year for higher studies.  Most of the foreign students are from Iran, Afganisthan, China, Maldives and different parts of Africa.

Universities
 University of Mysore
 Jagadguru Sri Shivarathreeswara University
 Karnataka State Music University, Mysore
 Karnataka State Open University
 Amrita University

Colleges and institutes
 Christ College Mysuru
 Hindustan First Grade College, Mysore
All India Institute of Speech and Hearing, Mysore
 Vivekananda Institute, Mysore
 Seshadripuram Degree College, Mysore
 Sarada Vilas College
 JSS College of Pharmacy
 JSS Dental College
 JSS Medical College 
 Vidya Vardhaka College of Engineering
 Maharaja Institute of Technology Mysore
 National Institute of Engineering
 Maharaja's College, Mysore
 St. Philomena's College, Mysore
 Sri Jayachamarajendra College of Engineering
 Mysore Medical College & Research Institute
 GSSS Institute of Management Science
 SDM Institute for Management Development
 Chamarajendra Academy of Visual Arts
 Vidya Vikas Institute of Engineering & Technology
 Government Ayurveda Medical College and Hospital, Mysore
 RIE, Mysore

Schools
 Christ Public School Bogadi CBSE
 Christ School Thandavapura CBSE
 Kaliyuva Mane
 CFTRI School, Mysore
 Demonstration School, Mysore
 Parkinson Memorial School
 Atomic Energy Central School
 St. Joseph's High School, Mysore
 Marimallappa High School
 Sri Ramakrishna Vidyashala
 Sadvidya Pathashala
 Pramati Hillview Academy
 The Learning Curve International School, Mysore

References

 
Mysore
Mysore
Mysore-related lists